Since the beginning of the War in Iraq in 2003, Iraqi insurgents have targeted public figures and important individuals whom they believe to be working for the Coalition or its allied Iraqi forces.

Foreigners
 Sergio Vieira de Mello, UN High Commissioner for Human Rights and Special Representative for Iraq, killed in the 2003 Canal Hotel bombing by Jama'at al-Tawhid wal-Jihad.

Governing Council
 Aqila al-Hashimi, member of the Governing Council, assassinated by Ba'athists in western Baghdad. 
 Izzedine Salim, head of the Iraqi Governing Council, assassinated in JTJ car bombing in the Green Zone.

Journalists
 Atwar Bahjat, shot while covering the 2006 al-Askari mosque bombing for Al Arabiya.

Lawyers
 Saadoun Sughaiyer al-Janabi, shot in his home by masked gunmen in Iraqi Police uniforms. 
 Adel al-Zubeidi, shot while driving through a Sunni neighborhood of Baghdad. 
 Khamis al-Obeidi, abducted and shot while defending Saddam Hussein at his trial.

Members of Parliament
 Dhari Ali al-Fayadh, assassinated by al-Qaeda in Iraq car bombing. 
 Lamia Abed Khadouri Sakri, female MP, killed April 27, 2005
 Mohammed Awad, killed in the 2007 Iraqi Parliament bombing. 
 Saleh al-Ogaili
 Harith al-Obeidi, leader of Iraqi Accord Front

Military figures
 Sheikh Sittar, Awakening Council leader, killed with an improvised explosive device planted by AQI. 
 Fasal al Gaood, killed in suicide bombing at the Al Mansour Hotel. 
 Hussein Ali al-Shaalan

Police chiefs
 Khedeir Mekhalef Ali, Khaldiya police chief; September 15, 2003
 Amer Ali Nayef, Baghdad deputy police chief; January 10, 2005
 Khalid Hassan, Diwaniya police chief; August 11, 2007
 Ali al-Deylan, Baquba police chief; September 24, 2007
 Saleh Mohammed Hassan, Mosul Provincial Police Chief; January 24, 2008

Professors
 Abdul-Latif Ali al-Mayah, assassinated under suspicious circumstances during a period of violence against Iraqi intellectuals and academics.

Provincial governors
Ali Al-Haidri, Baghdad Governorate, assassinated by a group led by Abu Musab al-Zarqawi. 
Raja Nawaf Farhan al-Mahalawi, Anbar Governorate, kidnapped during the Battle of al-Qa'im and killed May 2005
Osama Youssef Kashmoula, Ninawa Governorate, killed July 14, 2005
Khalil Jalil Hamza, Al-Qādisiyyah Governorate
Mohammed Ali al-Hasani, Al Muthanna Governorate

Deputy governors
Hatem Kamil, Baghdad Governorate, killed in drive-by shooting.

Religious figures
 Abdul Majid al-Khoei, Shia cleric, killed by a mob at the Imam Ali Mosque in Najaf, possibly under the influence of Muqtada al-Sadr.  
 Mohammed Baqir al-Hakim, Shia cleric, killed in the 2003 Imam Ali Mosque bombing
 Paulos Faraj Rahho, Chaldean Catholic Archbishop, Kidnapped and executed in Mosul.

References

Iraq
Tactics of the Iraqi insurgency (2003–2011)
assassinations

Terrorism deaths in Iraq